The Ford Fiesta Rally2 (formerly known as Ford Fiesta R5 Mk. II) is a rally car developed and built by M-Sport to comply with Group Rally2 regulations. It is based upon the Ford Fiesta road car and made its debut in 2020.

Rally victories

World championships

World Rally Championship-2 Pro

World Rally Championship-2

Regional championships

European Rally Championship

Rally results

WRC-2 results

* Season still in progress.

References

External links

 
 Ford Fiesta Rally2 at eWRC-results.com

All-wheel-drive vehicles
Ford Fiesta
Ford Rally Sport vehicles
Rally2 cars